Flight 232 may refer to:

Ansett Airlines Flight 232, crashed on 15 November 1972
SAETA Flight 232, crashed on 15 August 1976
United Airlines Flight 232, crashed on 19 July 1989

0232